Yannick Neuville (born 19 June 1991) is a Belgian rally driver, who drives in the German Rally Championship. He is the younger brother of Thierry Neuville.

In 2015, Neuville competed in the ADAC Opel Rallye Cup and finished third.

Career results

ADAC Opel Rallye Cup results

WRC results

External links
https://www.ewrc-results.com/profile/38438-Yannick-Neuville/

Living people
1991 births
Belgian rally drivers
People from St. Vith
Sportspeople from Liège Province